The following is a list of people who have been guests on Saturday Night Live. This section consists of people who fall between the letters U and Z.

The list below shows the people who have appeared on the show. It is split into three sections: Host, if the person hosted the show at any given time; Musical guest, if a person was the musical guest on the show at any given time; and Cameo, which is for a person who has appeared on the show but did not act as host or musical guest at any given time.

U

V

W

X

Y

Z

See also
List of Saturday Night Live guests (A–D)
List of Saturday Night Live guests (E–H)
List of Saturday Night Live guests (I–L)
List of Saturday Night Live guests (M–P)
List of Saturday Night Live guests (Q–T)

References

Guests U-Z

pt:Anexo:Lista de convidados do Saturday Night Live